Readick is a surname. Notable people with this surname include:

 Bob Readick (1925–1985), American actor
 Frank Readick (1896–1965), American actor

See also
Reddick (surname)
Redick
Riddick (disambiguation)